Duncan Creek may refer to:

Duncan Creek (Crooked Creek), a stream in Missouri
Duncan Creek (Little Osage River), a stream in Missouri
Duncan Creek (California), a tributary of Pinole Creek
Duncan Creek (Idaho), a National Wild and Scenic River
Duncan Creek (South Carolina), traversed by South Carolina Highway 391

See also

 Duncan River (disambiguation)

 Duncan (disambiguation)
 Creek (disambiguation)